The 1960–61 Scottish Cup was the 76th staging of Scotland's most prestigious football knockout competition. The Cup was won by Dunfermline Athletic who defeated Celtic in the replayed final.

First round

Replays

Second round

Replays

Third round

Replays

Quarter-finals

Replays

Semi-finals

Replay

Final 

Teams

Replay 

Teams

See also 
 1960–61 in Scottish football
 1960–61 Scottish League Cup

References

External links
 Video highlights from official Pathé News archive

Scottish Cup seasons
Scottish Cup, 1960-61
Scot